Universal vaccine(s) may refer to:
 Universal coronavirus vaccine
 Universal flu vaccine